The Greenwald Rabbinic family was a family which produced several generations of Hungarian rabbis. It traces its roots to Meir Eisenstadt, the Chacham Tzvi, and the Maharal. The Pupa Hasidic dynasty is descended from the Greenwald family.

Family members 

 Moshe Greenwald

 Yaakov Yechezkiya Greenwald

 Yosef Greenwald

 Yaakov Yechezkia Greenwald II 

 Eliezer David Greenwald

References

Jewish-Hungarian families
Hungarian Orthodox rabbis
Hasidic rabbis in Europe
19th-century Hungarian rabbis